Câu lạc bộ bóng đá Cà Mau, simply known as Cà Mau, was a professional football club, based in Cà Mau City, Cà Mau, Vietnam, dissolved in 2018.

Current squad

Managers
 Dương Hữu Cường (?-2015)
 Trần Công Minh (10 December 2015-present)

References

External links
 

Cà Mau F.C.